Dm-Arena is a multi-purpose hall in Rheinstetten near Karlsruhe, Germany. The indoor arena is one of four exhibition halls of the Karlsruhe Trade Fair Centre. It opened in 2003 and holds 14,000 people. It hosts mainly trade shows and indoor sporting events like the Indoor Meeting Karlsruhe. While the Karlsruhe Trade Fair Centre is operated by a municipal company, the Dm-Arena carries the name of the sponsor dm-drogerie markt, a chain of retail stores headquartered in Karlsruhe.

External links 

Official Website

Buildings and structures in Karlsruhe (district)
Indoor arenas in Germany
Event venues established in 2003
Sports venues in Baden-Württemberg